Party of Construction and Labour (in French: Parti de la construction et du travail) is a political party in Benin. Its youth wing is known as Forum International de la Jeunesse.

Political parties in Benin
Political parties with year of establishment missing